Falmey is a village and rural commune in the Falmey Department of the Dosso Region of Niger.

References

Communes of Niger
Dosso Region